The Baltimore Choral Arts Society is a music organization in Baltimore, Maryland that manages a full orchestra, a chorus and a chamber chorus.

Social media

Baltimore Choral Arts on Facebook

Culture of Baltimore